This is a list of works by Henri Herz (1803–1888).

Piano

Piano Solo
Air Tyrolien varié, Op. 1
Rondo alla Cosacca, Op. 2
L'Allemande,  Op. 3/1
L'Anglaise, Op. 3/2
La Folie, Op. 3/3
Airs de ballets de l'opéra "Moïse" de Rossini, Op. 3/4
Allegro et variations faciles composés d'après des motifs de C. de Marexcot, Op. 3/5
Stabat Mater de G. Rossini : transcrit pour piano solo, Op. 4/1
Air de basse, Op. 4/2
Fantasie, Op. 5
Introduction, Variations & Finale concertants, Op. 7
Variations avec introduction, Op. 8/1
Polonaise, Op. 8/2
Variations et rondeau sur un air allemand favori : pour le piano-forte, Op. 9
Variations brillantes sur l'air favori "Ma Fanchette est charmante" (Boieldieu), Op. 10
Grande Fantaisie sur "La Romanesca", Op. 11
, Op. 12
Variations sur un air tyrolien favori composées et dédiées à Madlle. Poyferé de Cères, Op. 13
Rondo Brillante sur un Air Favori de La Geige, Op. 14
Premier Divertissement, Op. 15
Variations brillantes sur la cavatine favorite de l'opéra Donna del Lago de Rossini, Op. 17
Variations de bravoure sur la Romance de Joseph, Op. 20
Exercices et préludes pour piano : dans tous les tons majeurs et mineurs, Op. 21
Second divertissement brillant sur une cavatine favorite de Rossini, Op. 22
Variations brillantes pour piano forte seul sur le chœur favori d'Il crocciato de Meyerbeer, Op. 23
Polonaise brillante, Op. 25
, Op. 26
Variations non difficiles sur la gavotte de Vestris, Op. 28
Variations et finale sur un air de ballet de F. Paer, Op. 29
Trois Airs Variés, Op. 30
Saxon air with introduction & variations, Op. 31
Caprice ou Grande Fantaisie et Variations Brillantes, Op. 32
Rondo caractéristique pour le piano forte sur la barcarolle de Marie, Op. 33
Contredanses variées suivis d'une valse, Op. 35
Grandes variations sur le choeur des Grecs du Siège de Corinthe de Rossini, Op. 36
Rondo on a favourite song from Moïse, Op. 37
Sul margine d'un rio, Op. 38
Trois airs variés, Op. 39
Rondoletto, Op. 40
Grandes variations brillantes sur l'air favori Le petit tambour, Op. 41
Variations quasi fantaisie sur le trio favori de Mazaniello "Notre Dame du Mont Carmel" de Cassasa, Op. 43
Rondo-capriccio sur la barcarolle favorite de La muette de Portici, Op. 44
La dolcezza, Op. 45/1
La melanconia, Op. 45/2
La semplicità, Op. 45/3
Air Suisse, Op. 46
Grande fantaisie sur des airs de l'opéra Le Comte Ory de Rossini, Op. 47
Variations brillantes, Introduction et Final alla Militare, sur la Cavatine favorite de La Violette de Carafa - Arrangement facile par Hartl, Op. 48
Les élégances : contredanses brillantes et variées suivies d'une grande valse, Op. 49
Variations brillantes sur la dernière valse de C. M. de Weber, Op. 51
Introduction et Rondo sur le Carillon motif favori des Deux Nuits, musique de Boieldieu ou 1er. Caprice, Op. 52
Polacca from the musical bijou for 1830 on the favorite romance Dormez, dormez, chères amours, Op. 53
Thème original : with brilliant variations,  Op. 55
La Parisienne, Op. 58
Variations on 'Non Più Mesta' from Rossini's 'La Cenerentola', Op. 60
Trois Rondeaux Caractéristiques, Op. 61
Grandes variations sur le Choeur des Chasseurs d'Euriante de Weber, Op. 62
Marche et Rondo sur "La clochette", Op. 63
La mode : contredanses variées : suivies d'une gallopade, Op. 64
Nocturne, Op. 65/1
Polka, Op. 65/2
Cavatine de Zampa variée, Op. 66
Variations on the March from Rossini's 'Otello', Op. 67
Cavatina from Semiramide variations, Op. 68
Rondo Militaire on a March from 'Le Serment', Op. 69
Récréations musicales : rondeaux, variations & fantasies pour le piano forte sur 24 thèmes organisés en huit suites, Op. 71
Agitato et rondo sur la barcarolle chantée par Tamburini dans l'opera Gianni di Calais de Donizetti, Op. 73
Souvenir de Vienne, Paris, et Londres : trois fantasies, Op. 75
Variations on the Trio from 'Le Pre aux Clercs', Op. 76
Variations Brillantes and Finale à la Hongroise from Mathilde di Shabran, Op. 77
Variations brillantes dans une forme nouvelle sur la cavatine favorite Vivi tu, Op. 78
La Coquette, scène de Bal, Op. 79
Les Rivales, deux mélodies variées, Op. 80
Introduction & Variations on an original Theme, Op. 81
Grandes variations seul sur la marche favorite de l'opéra de Bellini I Puritani, Op. 82
Les Étrangères, Op. 83
Rondo : (Valse de la reine d'Angleterre), Op. 85
Melodies, variées, Op. 88
Fantaisie dramatique, Op. 89
Trois morceaux de salon, Op. 91
Grandes variations de concert avec introduction et finale sur un Laendler viennois, Op. 92
Fantaisie et variations sur deux motifs du Postillon de Lonjumeau, Op. 94
Variations brillantes : avec introduction & finale sur une marche autrichienne, Op. 97
Grande fantaisie brillante sur un motif favori de l'opéra d'Ambroise Thomas: La double Échelle, Op. 98
Méthode complète, Op. 100
Melange sur l'opera Elisa e Claudio, Op. 101
Grande fantaisie sur des motifs favoris de Lucia di Lamermoor de Donizetti, Op. 102
Rondo brillant : sur Stradella, musique de Niedermeyer, Op. 103
Grand duo du couronnement, Op. 104
Variations Brillantes on a Theme by Bellini - La Sonnambula, Op. 105
Fantaisie brillante en forme de rondo sur des motifs du "Domino noir", musique de D. F. E. Auber, Op. 106
Six amusements, Op. 107
Fantaisie brillante sur des motifs de l'opera de L. Clapisson, La Figurante, Op. 108
Petit divertissement sur une Cracovienne favourite, Op. 109
Grande fantaisie sur la Romanesca, fameux air de danse du XVIe siècle, Op. 111
Grande fantaisie et variations brillantes sur des motifs de l'opéra: L'Élisire d'Amore de Donizetti, Op. 112
Variations et rondo sur Le lac des fées d'Auber, Op. 114
Grande fantaisie et finale à la militaire sur 2 mélodies de F. Schubert, Op. 115
La Catalane : rondo-bolero sur un motif de A. Elwart, Op. 116
Ballade, Op. 117/1
Ballade, Op. 117/2
Trois soeurs : 3 fantasies sur des motifs originaux, Op. 118
30 études progressives, Op. 119
Marche favorite des chasseurs de Lutzow ou Grettly, valse suisse ou styrian Waltz, (also known as Grand Swiss Waltz) Op. 120.
Grande fantaisie sur Les diamans de la couronne : opéra de D. F. E. Auber, Op. 126
Variations et Rondino sur 2 motifs de L.s Clapisson, Op. 127
Divertisement sur le galop de l'opera La jolie fille de Gand, Op. 128
Grand Concert Fantasy on themes from Semiramide de Rossini, Op. 130
Le Tremolo, sur un thème de Beethoven, Op. 132
Fantaisie et variations brillantes : sur l'opéra de Donizetti, Parisina, Op. 133
La Polka : arrangée pour le piano, Op. 135
Variations caractéristiques sur un thème arabe (Pas de L'abeille, de La péri, de F. Burgmüller), Op. 137
Grande fantaisie sur un motif de Linda di Chamonix, Op. 138
Dom Sébastien : opéra de Donizetti : 3 divertissements sur des airs de ballet, Op. 139
Les Succes de Salon, Cavatine de Vaccay, Op. 142
Lutine, Valse Brillante, Op. 145
Grande fantaisie brillante sur des motifs favoris de l'opéra Lucrezia Borgia de G. Donizetti, Op. 147
Les fleurs italiennes, Op. 149
24 études très faciles, pour les commençants, Op. 151
La Pastorale ou 18 grandes études de concert, Op. 153
Nouvelle tyrolienne originale : variée pour le piano, Op. 154
Fantasy & Variations on various American National Themes, Op. 158
Variations brillantes on "The last rose of summer", Op. 159
Three new American polkas, Op. 160
Tribut à l'Amérique suivi d'une polka de concert, Op. 161
Carry me Back, Op. 162/1
O Susannah!, Op. 162/2
Fantaisie Mexicane, Op. 162/3
Grande fantaisie militaire avec accompagnement d'orchestre sur la marche populaire de l'opéra La fille du régiment, Op. 163
Marche nationale mexicaine, Op. 166
La Californienne, Op. 167
L' écume de mer : marche et valse brillante, Op. 168
Le Carnaval de Venise: Variations Brilliantes, Op. 170
La Tapada, Op. 171
, Op. 175
Fantaisie brillante sur des motifs de Charles VI (?), Op. 184
Le chant du pèlerin : élégie, Op. 187
Marche et Rondo de Ernani, Op. 189
Rêverie nocturne, Op. 194
Grande sonate di Bravura, Op. 200
Les perles animées Grande Valse, Op. 211
Récréations illustrées : 12 petites fantasies caracteristiques pour le piano d'une execution facile et sans écarts de mains, Op. 215
La Belle Créole, Op. 217
Fantaisie et variations brillantes sur des motifs de La sirene : opéra de D.F.E. Auber
Empress Henriettas waltz
Flower of America, waltz
Galop à la Giraffe
Grande fantaisie militaire
La Barcarolle: Fantasie four le piano sur une Barcarolle celebre de Weber
Le Chalet Rondo
Paganini's Last Waltz
Polka Caprice
Rondo de Paganini
Rondo sur un air français (ed. J.P. Coulon)
Scales and Exercises, Part 1&2
The Celebrated Marseilles march (La Marseillaise)
The drawing room schottisch
The flower of the prairie waltz
There is no home like my own
La valse Suisse : rondeau dal Guglielmo Tell di Rossini
Faites-lui mes aveux
Three Irish melodies arranged for the Piano
Fantaisie brillante sur La part du diable de D.F.E. Auber
Six galops brillants : composés pour les bals de l'opera
Rondoletto de chasse
Variations sur un thème original de T. Labarre
Comic polka
Gaily the troubadour a celebrated air with an introduction & variations
Blue bells of Scotland
The celebrated Cinderella waltz
A second divertimento in which is introduced Rossini's celebrated cavatina: Dinnebraca Donzella
Fleurs de chant
Rondo turc
Three airs de ballet : from Auber's opera of La bayadère : arranged as rondos for Piano
Technical studies
La Carlotta Grisi, grande valse
Tribute to america (Polka de salon)
3 airs de ballets de la Muette de Portici

Piano, four hands
Grandes variations sur une marche favorite de Guillaume Tell, Op. 50
Variations concertantes sur la marche favorite du Philtre (Der Liebestrank) de D.F.E. Auber, Op. 70
Grand duo brillant sur un motif de l'opera L'Elisire d'amore de Donizetti, Op. 113
Air montagnard : varié, Op. 129
Les Belles du Nord, Op. 140
Grand duo concertant sur des motifs favoris du Désert, musique de F. David, Op. 156
Variations sur l'air Allemand "O Mein lieber Augustin"
Duo sur la flûte enchantée.

Two Pianos
Home Sweet Home ou Variations et rondeau brillant, Op. 16
Second grand duo concertant sur les marches favorites d'Alexandre et de La donna del lago, Op. 72
Introduction, theme with four variations, and rondo in B♭ Major

Chamber music

Violin and Piano
Duo & variations concertans pour Piano et Violon sur la romance: C'est une larme, Op. 18
Fantaisie & variations pour Piano et Violon composées sur des thèmes russes, Op. 19
Variations concertantes pour Piano et Violon sur la chansonnette favorite de L'enfant du régiment, Op. 24
Variations brillantes pour Piano et Violon sur la marche favorite de Moïse, Op. 42
Variations concertantes pour Piano et Violon sur la tyrolienne favorite de La fiancée d'Auber, Op. 56
Variations concertantes pour Piano & Violon sur la barcarolle favorite de Fra Diavolo de D. F. E. Auber, Op. 59
Dernier grand duo concertant pour Piano et Violon sur une cavatine favorite de la Niobe de Pacini, Op. 110

Piano Trio
Piano Trio, Op. 54

Other
Grand Variations pour Piano, Violon, Alto et Violoncelle, Op. 6
Rondo de concert pour Piano, 2violons, alto et basse ad libitum, Op. 27

Orchestral

Piano and Orchestra
Grande Polonaise for piano and Orchestra op. 30
Piano Concerto No. 1 in A major, Op. 34 (1828)
Variations de concert sur une marche favorite de Guillaume Tell de Rossini pour Piano et Orchestre, Op. 57
Piano Concerto No. 2 in C minor, Op. 74 (1834)
Piano Concerto No. 3 in D minor, Op. 87 (1835)
Fantaisie et variations sur un thème favori de Bellini pour Piano et Orchestre, Op. 90
Piano Concerto No. 4 in E major, Op. 131 (1843)
Piano Concerto No. 5 in F minor, Op. 180 (1854)
Piano Concerto No. 6 in A major, with chorus, Op. 192 (1858)
Piano Concerto No. 7 in B minor, Op. 207 (1864)
Piano Concerto No. 8 in A-flat major, Op. 218 (1873)

Songs
I will return to thee
The pilgrimage
Tis sad to part
We have liv'd and lov'd together
Why are you weeping dear mother !
O No, I never Shall Forget

References

External links
list of compositions (in German)
list of compositions (in French)

Herz, Henry